Hugo del Vecchio (22 February 1928 – 7 September 1999) was an Argentine basketball player who competed in the 1952 Summer Olympics.

References

1928 births
1999 deaths
Argentine men's basketball players
Olympic basketball players of Argentina
Basketball players at the 1951 Pan American Games
Basketball players at the 1952 Summer Olympics
Pan American Games silver medalists for Argentina
Pan American Games medalists in basketball
FIBA World Championship-winning players
Medalists at the 1951 Pan American Games
1950 FIBA World Championship players